The Donbas strategic offensive was a military campaign fought in the Donets Basin from 17 July to 2 August 1943, between the German and Soviet armed forces on the Eastern Front of World War II. The Germans contained the Soviet offensive in its northern portion after initial gains and pushed the southern portion back to its starting point.

Battle

In July 1943, while the Battle of Kursk was raging to the north, two German armies of Army Group South in the Donets Basin confronted two Soviet army groups on a 660-kilometer front. Stavka launched two offensives on 17 July in the Donets basin, involving 474,220 men and 1,864 tanks and assault guns. The Izyum–Barvenkovo offensive against the 1st Panzer Army consisted of 202,430 Soviet troops as well as 1,109 tanks and assault guns. Air support was provided by the 17th Air Army. The Soviets established bridgeheads several kilometers deep but were stopped by a German counteroffensive led by two Panzer Divisions. After ten days the Soviets called off the operation, having lost 38,690 men.

The Mius offensive deployed 271,790 men with 737 tanks and assault guns in four field armies as well as the 8th Air Army against the 11 heavily under-strength divisions of the German 6th Army. The Soviets achieved a penetration 15 kilometers deep and 20 kilometers wide, alarming the German High Command. After initial interference from Adolf Hitler in delaying the movement of German reinforcements, a counteroffensive deploying 258 operational tanks in five Panzer and Panzergrenadier divisions, including the SS divisions Das Reich and Totenkopf, was launched on 30 July. The German counterattack was backed by the Luftwaffe's IV Air Corps, providing close air support and air interdiction against the Red Army. The attack achieved immediate success, encircling five Soviet divisions on the second day. A wild, general rout of the Soviet armies to the Mius followed. On 2 August, the Germans reached the Mius at Dmytrivka, regaining their positions after inflicting at least 61,070 casualties on the Soviets, of which 15,303 were listed as killed or missing. Actual Soviet losses were far higher, as 6th Army took 17,762 prisoners, more than the Soviet total for killed and missing.

Operationally, the Germans stopped the attacks of two Soviet army groups in their tracks and inflicted at least 99,760 casualties on the Red Army, while losing more than 21,369 men themselves. Strategically, the Red Army failed in its objectives but achieved an indirect success by forcing the transfer of German armored forces from the Kursk salient, smoothing the ground for Operation Rumyantsev, the Soviet attack on Kharkov, which was launched on 3 August. The Germans were forced once again to redeploy their most battle-worthy mechanized divisions to contain this more immediate threat, which the Soviets exploited by launching a successful offensive in the Donets region on 13 August, deploying 1,053,000 men.

Citations

Bibliography
 

Battles and operations of the Soviet–German War
Military operations of World War II involving Germany
Strategic operations of the Red Army in World War II
Donbas
1943 in Ukraine
July 1943 events
August 1943 events